Leon Bumbarger McCarty (June 20, 1888 – September 18, 1962) was an American football and baseball coach. He was the 17th head football coach at the University of Kansas, serving for one season, in 1919, and compiling a record of 3–2–3. McCarty also was head baseball coach at Kansas from 1914 to 1917 and in 1920, tallying a record of 37–21–1 and winning Missouri Valley Conference championships in 1914 and 1915.

McCarty was a 1910 graduate of Ohio State University, where he lettered in football in 1908 and 1909.

Head coaching record

Football

References

External links
 

1888 births
1962 deaths
Kansas Jayhawks baseball coaches
Kansas Jayhawks football coaches
Ohio State Buckeyes football players
Sportspeople from Columbus, Ohio
Players of American football from Columbus, Ohio